East Delhi is an administrative district of Delhi in India. It is bounded by the Yamuna River on the west, North East Delhi to the north, Ghaziabad District of Uttar Pradesh state to the east, and Gautam Buddha Nagar District of Uttar Pradesh to the south. Administratively, the district is divided into three subdivisions: Gandhi Nagar, Preet Vihar, and Mayur Vihar.

EDMC is the civic authority of this region. Smt. Pinku putti is the current mayor of EDMC.

Demographics
According to the 2011 census East Delhi has a population of 1,709,346, roughly equal to the nation of The Gambia or the US state of Nebraska. This gives it a ranking of 284th in India (out of a total of 640). Its population growth rate over the decade 2001-2011 was 16.68%.	East Delhi has a sex ratio of 883 females for every 1000 males, and a literacy rate of 88.75%.
[Hindu] 73%
[Muslim]13%
[Sikh] 9%
[Others] 5%

Visitor attractions
 Akshardham Temple (one of the biggest temples in the world)
 Cross River Mall
 Gandhi Nagar Market
 Lal Quarter Market, Krishna Nagar
 V3S Mall
 Yamuna Sports Complex
 Sanjay Lake

Health institutions
 Saini Diagnostics, Shahdara (Diagnostic centre and COVID-19 testing centre)
 Chacha Nehru Bal Chikitsalya, Geeta Colony
 Delhi State Cancer Institute
 Dr. Hedgewar Arogya Sansthan situated at karkardooma
 Guru Tegh Bahadur Hospital (or GTBH or GTB Hospital) is a 1500-bed government hospital situated at Dilshad Garden and is affiliated to and acts as the teaching hospital of University College of Medical Sciences.
 Institute of Human Behaviour & Allied Sciences (IHBAS)
 Jain Neuro Center
 Lal Bahadur Shastri Hospital, Khichri Pur
 Makkar Super Speciality Hospital, Khureji Road
 Max Super Speciality Hospital, Patparganj
 Pushpanjali Hospital
 Vivekanad Yogashram Hospital, Khureji Khas
 Women wellness Clinic (Gynecology)
 WHO Dispensary (Bank Enclave)
 Government of India Dispensary (Jagat Ram Park)
 Walia Nursing & Maternity Home , Main Vikas Marg, Laxmi Nagar (Delhi)

Major localities
 Azad Nagar
 Anand Vihar Colony
 Bahubali Enclave
 Balbir Nagar
 Dallupura
 Dayanand Vihar
 Dilshad colony
 Dilshad Garden
 Durga Puri
 East Vinod Nagar
 Gandhi Nagar
 Ganesh Nagar
 Gazipur
 Geeta Colony
 Gagan Vihar
 Hasanpur Village
 Jagatpuri
 Jhilmil colony
 Jyoti Nagar(east)
 Jyoti Nagar(west)
 Kanti nagar
 Kalyan Puri
 Khureji khas
 Krishna Nagar
 Laxmi Nagar (Delhi)
 Mandaoli
 Mandawali
 Mayur Vihar
 Mayur Vihar Phase - 3
 New Ashok Nagar
 New Gobind Pura
 New Kondli
 New Layalpur Colony
 Nirman Vihar
 Old anarkali
 Pandav Nagar
 Patparganj (I.P.Extension)
 Preet Vihar
 Puspanjali
 Saini Enclave
 Savita Vihar
 Shahdara
 Shakarpur
 Shreshtha vihar
 Surajmal Vihar
 Surya Niketan
 Swasthya Vihar
 Tahirpur
 Trilokpuri
 Vasundhara Enclave
 Vishwas Nagar
 Vivek Vihar
 Vigyan Vihar
 West Vinod Nagar
 Yamuna Vihar
 Yojana Vihar
 Mansarovar park

See also
 Districts of Delhi

References

External links

educationplus/article3318555.ece Preparing youth to meet industry needs

East Delhi district
Districts of Delhi